Oum Touyour (also written Oum Tiour or Oum Thiour) is a town and commune in El M'Ghair District, El Oued Province, Algeria. According to the 2008 census it has a population of 11,069, up from 9,735 in 1998, with an annual growth rate of 1.3%, the lowest in the province.

Climate

Oum Touyour has a hot desert climate (Köppen climate classification BWh), with very hot summers and mild winters, and very little precipitation throughout the year.

Transportation

The regional road W300 connects Oum Touyour to national highway N3, which connects to Biskra to the north and Touggourt to the south. It is also the main link to the Oum Touyour aerodrome.

A short link called the N46A connects the N3 to Baadj just to the north, and from there the W31 leads northwest to Ouled Djellal. Further north, at Still, the N48 leaves the N3 to the southwest, connecting the provincial capital El Oued.

Education

6.8% of the population has a tertiary education, and another 15.4% has completed secondary education. The overall literacy rate is 74.4%, and is 81.5% among males and 67.5% among females.

Localities
The commune of Oum Touyour is composed of two localities:

Oum Thiour
Baadj

References

Neighbouring towns and cities

Communes of El Oued Province
Algeria